Little Sharks is a 1992 German comedy film directed by Sönke Wortmann.

Cast

References

External links 

1992 films
1992 comedy films
German comedy films
1990s German-language films
1990s German films
Films directed by Sönke Wortmann